Samuel Gelfan (16 January 1903, Russian Empire – 16 March 1975, Ossining, New York) was an American professor of neurophysiology. He was a Guggenheim Fellow for the academic year 1932–1933.

Education and career
Gelfan graduated from the University of California at Los Angeles (UCLA) with A.B. in 1925 and Ph.D. in 1927. There he was a teaching fellow in biology from 1925 to 1927. He was from 1928 to 1930 a Donnelly Research Fellow at the University of Chicago and from 1930 to 1932 an assistant professor of physiology and pharmacology at the University of Alberta. For the academic year 1932–1933 he investigated muscle fibre physiology with Edgar D. Adrian at the University of Cambridge.

During the late 1930s Gelfan was a physiologist at the College of Medicine of the University of Illinois at Chicago. At the Columbia University College of Physicians and Surgeons he was an associate professor of physiology before he joined the faculty of the Yale School of Medicine. From 1946 to 1952 he was at Yale, where he became director of the aeromedical unit. There he and his colleagues studied the mammalian response to high‐altitude flight and explosive decompression. He was a professor of neurophysiology in the department of neurology and neurosurgery of  the New York Medical College (NYMC) from 1952 to 1973, when he retired. At NYMC he did research on spinal cord physiology with grants from the National Institutes of Health.

Gelfan was the author or co-author of articles published in the American Journal of Physiology, Proceedings of the Society for Experimental Biology and Medicine, Science, and Nature.

Family
Gelfan married Harriet Lucy Moore (1912–2013) on November 29, 1943. She graduated from Bryn Mawr College in 1932 and then studied in the Soviet Union. During the Spanish Civil War she donated a touring car to the Loyalists. During the 1950s she was subpoenaed several times to Washington, D.C. to testify before the Eastland Committee. She was an ardent supporter of civil rights and other leftwing causes well into her nineties. Samuel and Harriet Gelfan had four daughters and two sons. When she died at age 101 she was survived by her six children and six grandchildren.

Selected publications
 (See divinyl ether.)

References

1903 births
1975 deaths
Emigrants from the Russian Empire to the United States
American physiologists
Neurophysiologists
University of California, Los Angeles alumni
Yale School of Medicine faculty
New York Medical College faculty